Harry Loman was a British stage performer, comic, and afterwards a stage door keeper.

Loman was discovered by Fred Karno and joined his troupe, appearing alongside Charlie Chaplin and Stan Laurel. He then became the straight man in a double act, Lowe and Loman, which lasted for 25 years.

After a period of unemployment, he took up the position of stage doorman at the Criterion Theatre in London, remaining there for over 18 years.

He appeared as a castaway on the BBC Radio programme Desert Island Discs on 14 April 1973, at age 92, having worked in the theatre for 80 years.

He was awarded the Society of London Theatre Special Award (one of the Laurence Olivier Awards) in 1977.

References

External links 
 1915 Leeds Hippodrome Playbill featuring Lowe and Loman

Year of birth missing
Place of birth missing
Year of death missing
Place of death missing
British comedians
Laurence Olivier Award winners